Loiola is a railway station in San Sebastián, Basque Country, Spain. It is owned by Euskal Trenbide Sarea and operated by Euskotren. It lies on the San Sebastián-Hendaye railway, popularly known as the Topo line. The Cercanías San Sebastián station  serves the same area, but is unrelated to the Euskotren station.

History 
The station opened in 1912 as part of the San Sebastián-Hendaye railway.

The works to rebuild the original station started in 2015. First, the old station was demolished to make place for the new one, while at the same time the line was diverted to a provisional station. The new station opened on 5 March 2017, and features improved accessibility.

Services 
The station is served by Euskotren Trena lines E2 and E5. Line E2 runs every 15 minutes during weekdays and weekend afternoons, and every 30 minutes on weekend mornings. Line E5 serves the  branch, running every 15 minutes on weekdays and weekend afternoons, and every 30 minutes on weekend mornings.

References

External links
 

Euskotren Trena stations
Railway stations in San Sebastián
Railway stations in Spain opened in 1912
1912 establishments in Spain
Railway stations in Spain opened in 2017
2017 establishments in the Basque Country (autonomous community)
Railway stations in Spain opened in 2012